The Chicago Ballers were a basketball team based in Chicago, Illinois. The team competed in the Junior Basketball Association (JBA), a league created for high school and junior college players as an alternative to the National Collegiate Athletic Association (NCAA).

History 
The JBA was first announced on December 20, 2017, when media personality LaVar Ball said to Slam magazine that he would create a professional league targeted at high school graduates and fully funded by his sports apparel company Big Baller Brand. The league held tryouts in Chicago in April 2018, attracting 100 prospects but initially selecting only two players to its Chicago Ballers team: former Simeon Career Academy standout Kezo Brown and junior college player Antonio Singleton. However, it held more tryouts in the same city at a later date.

Brown, a former Chicago State commit embattled with mental health issues in high school, was encouraged to join the Ballers after Chicago State head coach Tracy Dildy was fired and assumed the same position with the Chicago JBA team. However, Dildy was replaced by Eddie Denard, who had been his assistant at Chicago State, before the season began. Singleton, on the other hand, struggled academically in high school and later played for Dakota College at Bottineau. On June 8, 2018, members of the Ballers were interviewed on WCIU-TV.

On July 13, coach Eddie Denard drew widespread criticism after shoving and verbally berating Montrell Dixson. In their next game on July 19, the Chicago squad was coached by former Sacramento State University assistant coach Nicolas Colon, effectively replacing coach Denard moving forward.

Final roster

References

External links 
JBA official website

Junior Basketball Association teams
Ballers